The 1951–52 Kentucky Wildcats men's basketball team represented University of Kentucky. The head coach was Adolph Rupp. The team was a member of the Southeast Conference and played their home games at Memorial Coliseum in Lexington, Kentucky. The Wildcats finished the season with a 29–3 (14–0 SEC) record.

Roster

Schedule and results

|-
!colspan=9 style=| Regular Season

|-
!colspan=9 style=| SEC Tournament

|-
!colspan=9 style=| NCAA Tournament

NCAA basketball tournament
East
Kentucky 82, Penn State 54
St. John's, New York 64, Kentucky 57

Rankings

Awards and honors
Cliff Hagan – Consensus First-team All-American

Team players drafted into the NBA

References

Kentucky
Kentucky
Kentucky Wildcats men's basketball seasons
1951 in sports in Kentucky
1952 in sports in Kentucky